Bernadette Charron-Bost is a French computer scientist specializing in distributed computing. She is a director of research for the French National Centre for Scientific Research (CNRS). Formerly affiliated with the École polytechnique, she recently moved to the École normale supérieure (Paris).

Selected publications

References

External links
Home page

Year of birth missing (living people)
Living people
French computer scientists
French women computer scientists
Researchers in distributed computing
Research directors of the French National Centre for Scientific Research